The Sport Australia Media Awards were established in 2002 to recognise excellence in Australian sports journalism and broadcasting. The awards focus on analytical and insightful reporting and the presentation of sport and sporting issues. The awards are the only dedicated sports media awards in Australia. The Walkley Awards do have several sports categories.

The most prestigious award is the Lifetime Achievement Award that recognises exceptional service to sports journalism over an extended period of time. This award is determined by the Sport Australia Board.

Lifetime Achievement Award

Best Reporting of an Issue in Australian Sport

Best Coverage of a Sporting Event

Best Individual Sport Coverage

Best Sport Profile

Best Coverage of Sport for People with a Disability

Best Sports Journalism from Rural or Regional media

Best Depiction of Inclusive Sport
From 2009 to 2017 called Best Coverage of Women in Sport.

Best Sports Photography

Best Analysis of the Business of Sport

Best Contribution to Sport via Digital Media

Innovation in Sports Media

Discontinued Awards

Best Depiction of the Value of Sport to Australians in a Community Setting
Up until 2009 named Community Sports Award

Best Journalism on Australian Sports Commission-related Programs

Youth Sport Media Award

References

Australian Sports Commission
Australian sports trophies and awards
Awards established in 2002
Australian literary awards
Australian journalism awards
Sports writing awards